Bucculatrix sporobolella is a moth in the family Bucculatricidae. It was described by August Busck in 1910 and is found in North America, where it has been recorded from New Mexico and California.

The larvae have been reported as feeding on Sporobolus airoides.

References

Natural History Museum Lepidoptera generic names catalog

Bucculatricidae
Moths described in 1910
Moths of North America